In algebraic geometry, a Coble hypersurface is one of the hypersurfaces associated to the Jacobian variety of a curve
of genus 2 or 3 by Arthur Coble.

There are two similar but different types of Coble hypersurfaces. 
The Kummer variety of the Jacobian of a genus 3 curve  can be embedded in 7-dimensional projective space under the 2-theta map, and is  then the singular locus of a  6-dimensional quartic hypersurface , called a Coble hypersurface.
Similarly the Jacobian of a genus 2 curve can be embedded in 8-dimensional projective space under the 3-theta map, and is  then the singular locus of a  7-dimensional cubic hypersurface , also called a Coble hypersurface.

See also
Coble curve (dimension 1)
Coble surface (dimension 2)
Coble variety (dimension 4)

References

Abelian varieties